Krasny Oktyabr is a rural locality (a settlement) and the administrative center of Krasnooktyabrskoye Rural Settlement, Pallasovsky District, Volgograd Oblast, Russia. The population was 1,836 as of 2010. There are 23 streets.

Geography 
Krasny Oktyabr is located on the left bank of the Torgun River, 29 km west of Pallasovka (the district's administrative centre) by road. Staraya Ivantsovka is the nearest rural locality.

References 

Rural localities in Pallasovsky District